Wiang is a Tai word for "fortified settlement" or "walled town, city" of Austroasiatic origin, from Proto-Austroasiatic *wa(a)ŋ. This toponymic element forms part of the names of certain ancient inhabited places located in an area stretching across Northern Thailand and Laos:
Wiang Chan, Vientiane (Viang chan), the capital of Laos
Wiang, Fang, Chiang Mai Province, Thailand
Wiang Kaen, Chiang Rai Province, Thailand
Wiang, Phrao, Chiang Mai Province, Thailand
Wiang, Mueang Chiang Rai, Chiang Rai Province, Thailand
Wiang, Chiang Khong, Chiang Rai Province, Thailand
Wiang, Thoeng, Chiang Rai Province, Thailand
Wiang, Chiang Saen, Chiang Rai Province, Thailand
Wiang Pa Pao District, Chiang Rai Province, Thailand
Wiang, Wiang Pa Pao
Wiang Kalong
Wiang, Phayao, Phayao Province, Thailand
Wiang Nuea, Mueang Lampang
Wiang Nuea Subdistrict, Lampang
Wiang Nuea, Pai
Wiang Nuea, Mae Hong Son 
Wiang Chai District, Chiang Rai Province, Thailand
Wiang Chai Subdistrict
Wiang Nuea, Wiang Chai
Wiang Kao District, Khon Kaen Province
Wiang Sa District, Nan
Wiang Haeng District, Chiang Mai Province
Wiang Chiang Rung District
Wiang Yong, Mueang Lamphun District
Wiang Tai, Pai District, Mae Hong Son Province
Wiang Hao, Phan District, in Chiang Rai Province
Wiang Nong Long District, Lamphun Province
Wiang Phang Kham, Mae Sai District, Chiang Rai Province
Phu Wiang District, Khon Kaen Province
Rop Wiang, Chiang Rai Province, Thailand
Wiang Kum Kam, Saraphi District, Chiang Mai Province. Recently restored settlement along the Ping River, which was built by King Mangrai as his capital before he moved it to Chiang Mai
Wiang Fa Ya, name of the old settlement of Muang Sing, Laos
Wiang Suan Dok, name of a walled settlement of the Lawa people older than Chiang Mai
Wiang Nophaburi, name of the place where king Mangrai founded his new city of Chiang Mai

See also
Chiang (place name)
Lao Wiang
Mandala (Southeast Asian political model)
Mueang
Tusi
Wiang Subdistrict (disambiguation)

References